Cunninghamella septata is a species of fungus in the family Cunninghamellaceae. It was described as new to science by mycologist Ru-Yong Zheng in 2001. Colonies of C. septata are low and flat, not greater than 1 mm high. The specific epithet refers to septa, which are present and common in all parts of the fungus.

References

External links

Fungi described in 2001
Cunninghamellaceae